The S.S. Golden Gate was a mail and passenger steamer that operated between San Francisco and Panama City from 1851 to 1862.
On its last voyage from San Francisco it caught fire and was destroyed with the loss of 204 lives off Manzanillo, Colima, Mexico.
The ship was carrying $1,400,000 in gold coins for Wells Fargo, as well as large amounts of gold and coins for the passengers.
Much of this was retrieved, but amateurs continue to search for gold with metal detectors on what is now called the Playa de Oro (Gold Beach).

Construction

The Golden Gate was built by William H. Webb of New York for the Pacific Mail Steamship Company.
The keel was laid down on 1 July 1850 at the  Webb & Allen shipyard in Manhattan, now located between Fifth and Seventh Streets on the East River.
She had three decks and weighed 2,067 tons.
The Golden Gate could carry 1,200 passengers, and had 1,500 lifejackets, lifeboats, and three fire hydrants.
The hydrants were to prove inadequate when put to the test.

The ship had three masts that could carry sails, but her main propulsion was from side paddle wheels  in diameter.
The wheels were powered by two oscillating engines from Novelty Iron Works.
The total cost of construction was $483,000.
The SS Illinois, serving the US mail service, was her twin.

Service

The Pacific Mail Steamship Company provided a regular mail service between San Francisco and New York that took about five weeks.
Twice a month a steamer sailed from San Francisco to Panama City, while another sailed from New York to Chagres (Colón) on the other side of the isthmus of Panama.
Passengers would cross the isthmus, a three day journey by canoe and mule, then take the waiting steamer to their destination. 
The Pacific Mail Steamship Company had half a dozen boats on the West Coast that served the San Francisco–Panama route.
Fares for the one-way trips were $250 for first class, $175 for second class and $100 for steerage.

The Golden Gate left New York in August or September 1851 and sailed via Rio de Janeiro and Valparaíso to Panama.
It began its maiden voyage as a passenger ship from Panama in October 1851.
It reached San Francisco on 19 November 1851.
In the first four years on the San Francisco–Panama route, from 1851 to 1855, the Golden Gate averaged a speed of 12 knots.
She once made a trip of 11 days and four hours, a record that stood until 1855.
At top speed she burned 6 tons of coal daily, but usually ran slower and used less coal.

The Golden Gate was thought to be one of the safest and most dependable of steamers in the region.
However, it seems that fires had begun in the kitchen before but had been put out.
There were other problems.
29 people on board died of cholera in 1852.
On 2 September that year she was seized for carrying too many passengers.
She grounded at Point Loma in 1854.

Last voyage
[[File:Burning of the Steamship Golden Gate July 27 1862 RMG PY0271.tiff |thumb|300px|Golden Gate" burning, lifeboats in foregound. Hand-colored lithograph from ]]
The fire that destroyed the Golden Gate occurred during the American Civil War.
The ship left San Francisco at 2:30 pm on Monday, 21 July 1862 under Captain W. H. Hudson, with Captain R. H. Pearson as a passenger.
She had a crew of 96 and was carrying 242 passengers, on whom 95 were in cabin class.
She carried US$1,400,000 in $50 gold coins for Wells Fargo, a huge amount at the time.
Many of the passengers were also carrying gold or had deposited gold with the purser.

It started about 4:45 pm in the floor between the kitchen and the engine room. 
Captain Hudson decided to run for shore while Pearson supervised firefighting.
As the fire intensified the steerage passengers were trapped, and the wind and motion pushed the flames to the rear.
Pearson broke down a bulkhead to rescue the chief engineer W. Waddell and crewmen from the engine room.

Many passengers had to jump overboard, and many were unable to reach a boat or swim to shore.
It was said that some of the passengers wore belts holding gold and silver coins, but had to discard them in the water so they would not be pulled down by the weight.

According to The New York Times of 9 August 1862, the ship carried 242 passengers and 95 officers and crew.
74 passengers survived, 21 from the first cabin, 22 from the second cabin and 31 from steerage.
Of the officers and crew, survivors were W. H. Hudson, Captain; W. Waddell, Chief Engineer; Mathew Nolan, First Mate; H. McKinney, Second Mate; J. K. Wood, Purser; and 58 others.
The survivors dug graves for the corpses that washed ashore, with wooden crosses to identify the victims.
Most of the survivors were picked up on 29 July 1862 by the steamer St Louis, which took them back to San Francisco.
Most survivors reached San Francisco in August.
The Daily Alta published their reports and those of captains Hudson and Pearson.

Salvage

The Mazatlan Cosmopolitan reported on 1 January 1863.

On 8 February 1863 the Daily Alta reported that the steamship Constitution had taken on board fifteen boxes holding $820,000 that had been recovered by William Irelan during a spell of calm weather.
He and a party of ten assistants had anchored a scow over the wreck.
An engine was used to dredge up sand and other materials to expose the wreck.
A steam pump and hose was used to clean off sand from the submerged boxes.
A diver attached ropes to each box, and they were hoisted aboard the scow by machinery.
The newspaper was optimistic that all the treasure would be recovered in the next two months.
However, some had been stolen by a gang of Mexicans.
In the end most of the gold was recovered and returned to Wells Fargo in 1863.

The wreck itself was covered by drifting sand.
A contractor from Boston named C.W. Johnson visited the site forty years later and decided to attempt salvage.
He built a pier to provide a platform for dredging equipment to avoid the problems of difficult currents, surf and winds.
He claimed in an article in Popular Mechanics'' in May 1903 that he had recovered $1,000,000.
Soon afterwards, the pier was destroyed by a hurricane, although many of the pumps and other equipment were recovered.
An unsuccessful attempt was made in 1931–1932 by the engineer Charles Pouliot.
It is said by the local people that a man called Veralman found gold in the 1960s and built the Posada Hotel with the money.

The safe in the purser's office was finally located in 2003 under  of sand by CEDAM, Conservation, Ecology, Diving, Archaeology and Museums.
The beach is still being searched for gold by enthusiasts with metal detectors.

Notes

Citations

Sources

Ships built in New York City
Ships built by William H. Webb
1851 ships
Sidewheel steamboats of California
Passenger ships of the United States
Shipwrecks of the Mexican Pacific coast
Ship fires
Maritime incidents in July 1862